Horner is an unincorporated community in Lewis County, West Virginia, United States. Horner has a post office with ZIP code 26372.

The community was named after Seymore Horner, the original owner of the town site.

References

Unincorporated communities in Lewis County, West Virginia
Unincorporated communities in West Virginia